Nandita Mahtani (born 1972) is an Indian fashion designer.

Career
Mahtani, along with Dino Morea, run a company called Playground.  For the past few years, Mahtani has been designing and styling cricketer Virat Kohli.

Personal life
Through her sister Anu Mahtani, Nandita Mahtani is a sister-in-law of Sanjay Hinduja, the son of Gopichand Hinduja.

Mahtani was earlier married to actress Karisma Kapoor's ex-husband Sanjay Kapur for four years, but parted their ways in 2000. She also dated Bollywood actors Ranbir Kapoor and Dino Morea. Ranbir Kapoor is Karisma Kapoor's first cousin.

References

External links

Indian women fashion designers
Living people
1972 births